Elections to Mid Bedfordshire District Council were held in May 2007. These were the last elections to council, with all 53 seats being up for election. Councillors elected would serve a two-year term, expiring in 2009, when Mid Bedfordshire District Council was replaced by Central Bedfordshire Council. The Conservative Party retained overall control of the council, winning 37 of 53 seats on the council.  The Conservatives won 8 seats (5 wards) unopposed, as did an Independent candidate in one ward.

Result

Ward Results
All results are listed below:

Figures on turnout were taken from Plymouth University's Elections Centre, which gives the number of registered voters, and the percentage turnout for each ward.  The number of ballots cast for each ward was calculated from these.  Percentage change in turnout is compared with the same ward in the 2003 District Council election.

The percentage of the vote for each candidate was calculated compared with the number of ballots cast in the ward.  Note that in a ward with more than one seat, voters were allowed to place as many crosses on the ballot paper as seats.  The percentage change for each candidate is compared with the same candidate in the 2003 District Council election.

Candidates who were members of the council before the election are marked with an asterisk.

Asterisks denote incumbent councillors seeking re-election.

Ampthill 
One Independent gain from Conservatives.

Arlesey 
One Conservative gain from Independent; one Conservative gain from Labour.

Aspley Guise

Biggleswade Holme

Biggleswade Ivel

Biggleswade Stratton

Clifton and Meppershall

Cranfield

Flitton, Greenfield and Pulloxhill 
One Green gain from Conservatives.

Flitwick East

Flitwick West

Harlington

Houghton, Haynes, Southill and Old Warden 
One Conservative gain from Liberal-Democrats.

Langford and Henlow Village 
Two Conservative gains from Liberal-Democrats.

Marston

Maulden and Clophill

Northill and Blunham

Potton and Wensley

Sandy Ivel

Sandy Pinnacle

Shefford, Campton and Gravenhurst

Shillington, Stondon and Henlow Camp 
One Liberal-Democrat gain from Conservatives.

Silsoe

Stotfold 
One Conservative gain from Liberal-Democrats.

Westoning and Tingrith

Woburn

Notes

References 

2007
2007 English local elections